is a Japanese TV station affiliated with Nippon News Network (NNN) and Nippon Television Network System (NNS) in Fukuoka, Fukuoka Prefecture, Kyushu, Japan. This station broadcasts programs throughout Fukuoka Prefecture as well as most of Saga Prefecture.

TV channel

Main station 
  Fukuoka 32ch(Digital) 37ch(Analog)

Tandem office 
 Haki 58ch(A)
 Kitakyūshū 32ch(D) 35ch(A)
 Kurume 21ch(D) 52ch(A) 
 Munakata 20ch(D) 
 Ōmuta 21ch(D) 43ch(A) 
 Yukuhashi 32ch(D) 43ch(A)

Program

Other TV stations in Fukuoka 
 NHK Fukuoka and Kitakyushu
 Kyushu Asahi Broadcasting (KBC, affiliated with TV Asahi and ANN) - 1
 RKB Mainichi Broadcasting (RKB, affiliated with TBS TV, Inc. and JNN) - 4
 TVQ Kyushu Broadcasting (TVQ, affiliated with TV Tokyo and TX Network) - 7
 Television Nishinippon Corporation (TNC, affiliated with CX and FNN / FNS) - 8

External links
 The official website of the FBS 

Nippon News Network
Television stations in Japan
Television channels and stations established in 1969
Mass media in Fukuoka